Ole Johs. Brunæs (4 February 1936 – 24 February 2019) was a Norwegian politician for the Conservative Party.

Early life 
He was elected to the Norwegian Parliament from Vestfold in 1989, and was re-elected on two occasions.

Brunæs was a deputy member of the executive committee of Sandefjord municipality council during the term 1979–1983.

References

1936 births
2019 deaths
Conservative Party (Norway) politicians
Members of the Storting
21st-century Norwegian politicians
20th-century Norwegian politicians